Esteros may refer to:

 Esteros (film), 2016 film
 Esteros, Tamaulipas, town in Mexico